Collapse Under The Empire is a German instrumental post-rock duo from Hamburg. Founded in 2008, the group consists of Chris Burda and Martin Grimm. They have released eight studio albums and a number of EPs and singles.

History 
Chris Burda and Martin Grimm found themselves together for the first time in summer 2008 in Hamburg. Under the name Collapse Under The Empire, four songs were composed for their first EP Paintball in 2009.

The debut album Systembreakdown was initially released independently in 2009. A year later the successor Find a Place to be Safe was released through the label Sister Jack Records and began to make the band known internationally. Magazines such as Q, Clash and Rock Sound praised the cinematic sound of the band.

The first psychedelic inspired Album appeared with The Sirens Sound and shortly after, the Split-EP Black Moon Empire in collaboration with the Russian band Mooncake. The band also contributed to the track Anthem of 44 for the Emo Diaries Compilation I Love You But in the End I Will Destroy You by Deep Elm Records.

The fourth album of the band, released in 2011, was Shoulder & Giants and was the first part of the concept works, for which the second part, Sacrifice & Isolation, has been announced for May 2014.

Shoulders & Giants received good reviews – the music magazine Visions, among other things, praised the "beyond all doubt, crystal clear production" and called it a "compelling and captivating album". Plattentests.de highlighted the "imaginative arrangements" and "cinematic clouds of sound" of the album and awarded it 8/10.

In September 2012, Collapse Under The Empire released their fifth album, Fragments of a Prayer on their own, newly founded label, Finaltune Records. It was nominated for album of the month in both Zillo and Sonic Seducer. The following year, the 6-track EP, The Silent Cry was released. It was selected by the magazine eclipsed for the top 50 releases of the year 2013.

In May 2014 Collapse Under The Empire completed their concept work with the second album Sacrifice & Isolation , her most ambitious work so far.

After eight years of pure studio work Collapse Under The Empire decided to bring their music live for the first time. The band made their live debut on 7 May 2016 at the Dunk!Festival in Belgium.

In October 2017, Collapse Under The Empire released their seventh album, The Fallen Ones and for the 10th anniversary of the band in December 2019 the compilation album "The End of Something" and the single "Beyond Us". In addition to the digital version, "The End of Something" was released in a limited (150 pieces) elaborate 4-LP box on 12th Dez. 2019.

Collapse Under The Empire release their 8th album Everything We Will Leave Beyond Us on 20 November 2020. On this album the duo completes the story they started in 2009 and at the same time open up a new chapter. All the themes Collapse Under The Empire have dealt with on their albums/ EPs so far, starting with Systembreakdown (2009), tell of a world full of conflicts, crises, catastrophes, death, isolation, longings and freedom. The pre-single Red Rain will be released on 16 November 2020.

Style 

Collapse Under the Empire play instrumental post-rock, but influences from other genres such as trip hop, shoegazing, synthpop and progressive hard rock can also be found within. The style of the band was compared to bands like 65daysofstatic and God Is An Astronaut.

Commitment to environmental protection and nature conservation 

The band has previously raised money for environmental organisations with two Charity Singles. In 2011 The Silent Death was published in aid of Sharkproject and in 2014 Lost was published in aid of Rettet den Regenwald.

Discography

Studio albums  
 Systembreakdown (2009)
 Find a Place to Be Safe (2010)
 The Sirens Sound (2010)
 Shoulders & Giants (2011)
 Fragments of a Prayer (2012)
 Sacrifice & Isolation (2014)
 The Fallen Ones – (2017)
 The End of Something – (2019)
 Everything We Will Leave Beyond Us – (2020)

EPs  
 Paintball (2009)
 Black Moon Empire (2011, split-EP)
 The Silent Cry (2013)
 Collapse Under The Empire vs. Cato - The Remixes – (2015)

Singles  
 Crawling – 2009
 Grade Separation – 2010
 Anthem of 44 – 2010
 Black Moon Empire – 2011 (Split Single)
 The Silent Death – 2011 (Charity Single)
 Disclosure /The Great Silence – 2011 (Double A-side Single)
 There’s No Sky – 2011
 Dragonfly – 2012 (Free-Single)
 Closer – 2012
 Breaking the Light – 2012
 Stjarna – 2013 (Depeche-Mode-Cover)
 We Are Close as This – 2013
 Lost – 2014 (Charity Single)
 Sacrifice/Low – 2014 (Double A-side Single)
 Stairs to the Redemption – 2014
 Giants (live) – 2016 (Single-Video)
 Dark Water – 2017
 The Forbidden Spark – 2017
 Anomaly – 2018
 Abstracted – 2019
 Beyond Us – 2019
 A New Beginning – 2020 (Charity Single)
 Red Rain – 2020
 Section IV – 2021
 Section V – 2021

References

External links

 

German rock music groups
Music in Hamburg
German post-rock groups
Musical groups established in 2008